Kolle is both a surname and a given name. Notable people with the name include:

Surname:
 Andy Kolle (born 1982), American boxer
 Helmut Kolle (1899–1931), German painter
 Jorge Kolle Cueto (died 2007), Bolivian politician
 Oswalt Kolle (1928–2010), German sex educator

Given name:
 Kirsti Kolle Grøndahl (born 1943), Norwegian politician

See also

 Kölle
 Kølle